WCLC was a broadcast radio station licensed to Jamestown, Tennessee, serving Jamestown and the vicinity. WCLC was owned and operated by New Life Studios, Inc. and it simulcast their programming from sister station WCLC-FM "New Life 105". This station operated only during the daytime hours.

External links
FCC Station Search Details: DWCLC (Facility ID: 30297)
FCC History Cards for WCLC (covering 1957-1979)

CLC
CLC
Radio stations established in 1957
1957 establishments in Tennessee
Defunct radio stations in the United States
Radio stations disestablished in 2021
2021 disestablishments in Tennessee
Defunct religious radio stations in the United States